Sérigné is a commune in the Vendée department in the Pays de la Loire region in western France. It is located 5 km northwest from Fontenay-le-Comte and 48 km southeast from La Roche-sur-Yon, the capital city of Vendée.

See also
Communes of the Vendée department

References

Communes of Vendée